The Mount Tipton School is a K-6 public school in Dolan Springs, Arizona. It serves the towns of Meadview, White Hills, Chloride, and Dolan Springs. It is operated by the Kingman Unified School District.

In 2013, the Kingman Unified School District voted to convert the K-12 school into a K-6 school, due to the difficulty of finding high school and middle school teachers that are certified across multiple subjects as well as the need to close a $1.1 million budget gap across the district.

References

Schools in Mohave County, Arizona
Public elementary schools in Arizona
Public middle schools in Arizona
Public high schools in Arizona
Public K-12 schools in the United States